Ignace Mandjambi (born 8 October 1940) is a former Congolese cyclist. He competed in the individual road race at the 1968 Summer Olympics.

References

External links
 

1940 births
Living people
Democratic Republic of the Congo male cyclists
Olympic cyclists of the Democratic Republic of the Congo
Cyclists at the 1968 Summer Olympics
People from Mongala
21st-century Democratic Republic of the Congo people